The UEFA Women's Euro 2001 final was an association football match on 7 July 2001 at Donaustadion in Ulm, Germany, to determine the winner of UEFA Women's Euro 2001.

Route to the final

Germany

Germany had a hard road to the final facing the like of Sweden in the group stages. England. and Russia in the group stages.

Norway was defeated by Germany to reach the final.

Sweden

Sweden were placed in Group A with Germany, Russia and England. They started off with a loss to Germany. Before Sweden crushed England and Russia in the group stages.

Sweden defeated Denmark in the semi-finals to face Germany.

Match Analysis

In a hard-fought match Germany prevailed against Sweden with a golden goal. Tina Theune-Meyer called the current German team the best one ever.

Marika Domanski-Lyfors the Swedish coached stated "Germany earned it because they were the stronger team in the last ten minutes. We played a good game but we did not manage to score so Germany were the better team."

Final

References

External links
Official tournament website
BBC site Euro 2001

Final
2001
2001
2001
July 2001 sports events in Europe